Joey Arrington (born July 25, 1956) is an American former NASCAR driver, team owner, and crew chief from Rocky Mount, Virginia. He made nine Winston Cup Series starts with a best finish of 12th. He made his first start in 1974 as a 17-year-old and raced until 1980.

He is currently the owner of Race Engines Plus LLC and is the son of former NASCAR driver Buddy Arrington. Arrington was a partner in Bobby Hamilton Racing.  Joey Arrington started Arrington Manufacturing and Arrington Engines in 2000. After selling his interests in both entities, he moved the majority of his business ventures to Concord, NC.  In 2012 Joey, once again, owned a NASCAR Camping World Truck Series Team under the Toyota banner with REP providing the engines.

Biography
Arrington is the son of Buddy and Jeanette Arrington, and often was present at his father's races. His interests in engines and car tuning were sparked by Petty Enterprises engine builder Maurice Petty, and Joey would tweak his skills in the Petty shop in Level Cross. After graduating high school in 1975, the younger Arrington became the crew chief and engine builder for his father's racing efforts.

Arrington was an integral part of Dodge's return to stock car racing, building engines and providing parts for Dodge teams for their return to ARCA in 1991, Trans-Am, and the Craftsman Truck Series in 1995.

Arrington Manufacturing / Race Engines Plus

In 2000, Arrington founded Arrington Manufacturing, Inc. in Martinsville, Virginia, also operating as Arrington Engines. Arrington built engines for Dodge truck teams Bobby Hamilton Racing and Ultra Motorsports, winning championships in 2004 and 2005 with Ted Musgrave and Bobby Hamilton.

In 2009, with Dodge pulling support from the Truck Series, Arrington shifted its focus and expanded into the aftermarket parts industry. That same year, they began providing engines to rookie Cup team Tommy Baldwin Racing, a team he had worked with in the NASCAR Nationwide Series.

In 2011, Arrington began his new entity, called Race Engines Plus and located in the auto racing hub of Concord, North Carolina. The company  builds race engines for teams in NASCAR, NHRA, and SCCA. Race Engines Plus also provides engine building contract services for businesses and individuals.  REP provides rebuild and complete engine building services for race teams and the speed enthusiast. The Weddington Road location of Race Engines Plus is the all under one roof engine building facility owned entirely by Joey Arrington.

Arrington's association with Dodge remains, providing customized HEMI engines for street cars. Buddy Arrington, Joey's father, was a 2015 Mopar Hall of Fame inductee.

References

1956 births
Living people
NASCAR drivers
NASCAR team owners
People from Rocky Mount, Virginia
Racing drivers from Virginia